York Township is one of the twelve townships of Fulton County, Ohio, United States. As of the 2010 census the population was 4,145, of whom 1,678 lived in the unincorporated portions of the township.

Geography
Located in the southern part of the county, it borders the following townships:
Pike Township - north
Fulton Township - northeast corner
Swan Creek Township - east
Washington Township, Henry County - southeast corner
Liberty Township, Henry County - south
Freedom Township, Henry County - southwest corner
Clinton Township - west
Dover Township - northwest corner
Much of the village of Delta is located in northeastern York Township.

Name and history
One of ten York Townships statewide, York Township was organized in 1836.

Government
The township is governed by a three-member board of trustees, who are elected in November of odd-numbered years to a four-year term beginning on the following January 1. Two are elected in the year after the presidential election and one is elected in the year before it. There is also an elected township fiscal officer, who serves a four-year term beginning on April 1 of the year after the election, which is held in November of the year before the presidential election. Vacancies in the fiscal officership or on the board of trustees are filled by the remaining trustees.

References

External links
County website

Townships in Fulton County, Ohio
Townships in Ohio